Kokotsha is a village in Kgalagadi District, Southern Botswana Botswana. It is located in the eastern part of the district, north of Werda. The population was 1,224 in 2011 census.

References

Kgalagadi District
Villages in Botswana